A nipper or tile nipper (like a pair of scissors or pliers) is a tool used to "nip" or remove small amounts of a hard material, such as pieces of a tile, which needs to be fitted around an odd or irregular shape.
For tile that requires a straight cut a tile cutter is used. This is a small mechanical device where the tile is placed, aligned and clamped on a platform; lightly "scored" with a cutting wheel and snapped in two with a handled slicer (blade similar to a paper cutter in appearance).
For larger jobs an electric tile saw or wet saw is used; this saw is similar to a small mitre saw except that water is distributed on the saw blade to lessen the effects of heat and friction.

A rail nipper is used in rail transport modelling to cut rail tracks.

See also
Tin snips
Pliers
Electrical wire cutting

References 
 Reader's Digest Book of Skills & Tools 

Cutting tools